Kazdağlı Mosque is a historical mosque located in Safranbolu, Turkey.

Architecture
It was constructed on the site of an old mosque in 1779 by Kazdağlı Mehmet Agha in the entrance of the bazaar of Safranbolu. The square planned mosque is constructed from stone and brick, and its upper side is covered with a squinched brick dome. A three part last congregation place is situated in the front part of the mosque. The middle part of the congregation place is covered with the dome, and other parts are covered with a cavetto vault. The dome and vaults are covered with bricks. The mihrab and minbar of the mosque are of plain design. The minaret, which is situated to the right of the entrance, is made of brick and has one balcony. There is no information about the old mosque. In 2004 ownership of the mosque passed to Head Office of Foundation from the Municipality, and it was restored in the same year.

See also
 List of mosques
 Ottoman architecture

References 
Article about Architecture of Safranbolu on Turizm.gov.tr
Article about Mosques of Safranbolu on Kenthaber.com

External links

 Images of Kazdağlı Mosque

Karabük
Mosques in Safranbolu
Buildings and structures in Karabük Province
Religious buildings and structures completed in 1779
Mosque buildings with domes
18th-century mosques